Stanley Gumut (born 21 February 1986) is a Nigerian professional basketball player. He is a native of Jos, Plateau State. He is a 6 ft. 6 in. (1.98 m) tall 210 lb. (95 kg) shooting guard-small forward.

Nigerian national team
Gumut has played internationally with the senior men's Nigerian national basketball team. He played with Nigeria at the 2007, 2011, and 2013 FIBA Africa Championships.

References

External links
FIBA Profile
AfroBasket.com Profile

1986 births
Living people
Nigerian men's basketball players
Sportspeople from Jos
Basketball players at the 2006 Commonwealth Games
Commonwealth Games competitors for Nigeria
Shooting guards
Small forwards
African Games bronze medalists for Nigeria
African Games medalists in basketball
Competitors at the 2007 All-Africa Games
Union Bank B.C. players
Al Sadd Doha basketball players
Mark Mentors players
20th-century Nigerian people
21st-century Nigerian people